Mangham is a village in Richland Parish in northeastern Louisiana, United States. The population was 672 at the 2010 census. Mangham was established in 1890. It is named for Wiley P. Mangham, the publisher of the Richland Beacon-News, a weekly newspaper in Rayville, the seat of Richland Parish.

Geography
Mangham is located at  (32.308304, -91.776225).

The community straddles the border with Franklin Parish. Louisiana Highway 15 runs through Mangham.

Demographics

As of the census of 2000, there were 595 people, 247 households, and 170 families residing in the town. The racial makeup of the town was 59.66% White, 39.83% African American, 0.17% Asian, and 0.34% from two or more races. Hispanic or Latino of any race were 1.34% of the population.

There were 247 households, out of which 28.3% had children under the age of 18 living with them, 40.9% were married couples living together, 27.1% had a female householder with no husband present, and 30.8% were non-families. 28.7% of all households were made up of individuals, and 13.0% had someone living alone who was 65 years of age or older. The average household size was 2.41 and the average family size was 2.96.

In the town, the population was spread out, with 27.1% under the age of 18, 7.4% from 18 to 24, 24.4% from 25 to 44, 23.5% from 45 to 64, and 17.6% who were 65 years of age or older. The median age was 38 years. For every 100 females, there were 85.4 males. For every 100 females age 18 and over, there were 72.9 males.

The median income for a household in the town was $17,500, and the median income for a family was $23,558. Males had a median income of $22,273 versus $18,125 for females. The per capita income for the town was $15,813. About 22.0% of families and 28.3% of the population were below the poverty line, including 42.8% of those under age 18 and 9.0% of those age 65 or over.

Education
Public schools in Richland Parish are operated by the Richland Parish School Board. Three campuses serve the village of Mangham - Mangham Elementary School (Grades PK-5), Mangham Junior High School (Grades 6-8), and Mangham High School (Grades 9-12).

Notable people

Ralph Abraham (born September 16, 1954), veterinarian and physician elected as a Republican to the U.S. House of Representatives in 2014
Robert Max Ross (August 5, 1933 – September 15, 2009) ran as a Republican candidate for governor in 1972 and 1983, as well as the United States Senate, the U.S. House of Representatives, the Louisiana State Senate, and for Mayor of Mangham, Louisiana.

References

External links
Mangham Progress Community Progress Site for Mangham, LA

Villages in Richland Parish, Louisiana
Villages in Louisiana